Aydın Toscalı (born 14 August 1980) is a Turkish former professional footballer who played as a centre-back. He has made one appearance for the Turkey national football team.

Honours 
Kayserispor
Turkish Cup: 2007–08

References

1980 births
Turkish footballers
Turkey international footballers
Association football defenders
MKE Ankaragücü footballers
Kayserispor footballers
Muğlaspor footballers
Tarsus Idman Yurdu footballers
Mersin İdman Yurdu footballers
Süper Lig players
Living people
People from Aydın